Asura mutabilis is a moth of the family Erebidae. It was described by Lars Kühne in 2007. It is found in Burundi, the Democratic Republic of the Congo, Uganda, Tanzania and Kenya.

References

Moths described in 2007
mutabilis
Moths of Africa